Jane Celestina Ross (born 18 September 1989) is a Scottish footballer who plays as a striker for Rangers in the Scottish Women's Premier League, and the Scotland national team.

Club career

Glasgow City
Ross grew up on the Isle of Bute and after attending local coaching clinics, began her career at youth level with Paisley Saints Ladies. By the age of 16, she had already been called into the Scotland Women's under-19 squad. In June 2006, she joined Glasgow City, where she won six Scottish Women's Premier League titles, three Scottish Cups and three League Cups. She also helped the club reach the last 16 of the UEFA Women's Champions League in the 2011–12 campaign. In April 2011, Ross scored four goals against Kilmarnock, joining a group of four Glasgow City players to score more than 100 goals for the club. Ross ended her time with Glasgow City having scored 104 goals in 118 matches.

At the end of the 2012 season, Ross had a trial period in Denmark with earlier Champions League opponents Fortuna Hjørring, before heading for further trials with several clubs in Sweden.

Vittsjö GIK

Ross agreed a professional contract with Vittsjö GIK at the end of December 2012, joining fellow Scotland international Ifeoma Dieke at the club. Ross scored on her debut for Vittsjö in a pre-season friendly match against Danish side B93/HIK/Skjold in February 2013. After 11 goals in her debut season, Ross was linked with a transfer to English FA WSL club Arsenal Ladies. Both Ross and Dieke extended their contracts with Vittsjö for another season in December 2013. Ross left Vittsjö after the 2015 season, having scored 51 goals in 82 appearances for the club.

Manchester City
Ross signed a two-year contract with Manchester City in November 2015. She left Manchester City after the 2017–18 season, having scored a total of 25 goals in 61 games across all competitions for the club.

West Ham United
On 9 July 2018, Ross signed with West Ham United ahead of the 2018–19 season. The campaign saw West Ham reach their first ever FA Cup final with Ross scoring the team's opening penalty of the semi-final shootout against Reading. The season was also notable as the subject of the BBC behind-the-scenes documentary Britain's Youngest Football Boss.

Manchester United
After one season in London, Ross returned to Manchester to sign with newly promoted Manchester United ahead of the 2019–20 season. Ross made her debut for Manchester United against Manchester City in the FA WSL on 7 September 2019, a 1–0 loss in the inaugural Manchester derby. She scored her first goal for the club on 13 October in a 3–0 league win away to Tottenham Hotspur. After two seasons, Ross left at the end of her contract having scored 7 goals in 34 appearances for United in all competitions.

Rangers
On 6 July 2021, Ross signed for Rangers.

International career

Ross won her first full international cap for Scotland against England in March 2009, and scored her first international goal in August the same year against Denmark. She made her 50th international appearance against the Netherlands in the 2013 Cyprus Cup tournament.

June 2012 saw Ross named one of four reserves to the 18-player Great Britain squad for the 2012 London Olympics.

Ross studied at the University of Stirling on a scholarship as part of the SFA National Women's Football Academy. She has deferred her M.Phil. degree while she pursues her professional career.

Career statistics

Club
.

International goals
 As of match played 19 February 2021. Scotland score listed first, score column indicates score after each Ross goal.

Honours

Club
Glasgow City
 Scottish Women's Premier League: 2010, 2011, 2012
 Scottish Women's Cup: 2011, 2012
 Scottish Women's Premier League Cup: 2012

Manchester City
 FA Women's Super League: 2016
 FA Women's League Cup: 2016
 FA Women's Cup: 2016–17

Individual
FA WSL Team of the Year: 2016–17

See also
 List of women's footballers with 100 or more caps
 Scottish FA Women's International Roll of Honour

References

External links

Profile at the Manchester United F.C. website

1989 births
Living people
Scottish women's footballers
Scotland women's international footballers
Women's association football forwards
People from Rothesay, Bute
Sportspeople from Scottish islands
Glasgow City F.C. players
Damallsvenskan players
Scottish expatriate women's footballers
Expatriate women's footballers in Sweden
Vittsjö GIK players
Women's Super League players
Manchester City W.F.C. players
FIFA Century Club
West Ham United F.C. Women players
2019 FIFA Women's World Cup players
Manchester United W.F.C. players
Sportspeople from Argyll and Bute
UEFA Women's Euro 2017 players